Gerhardt is a masculine name of Germanic origin. It can refer to the following:

As a first name

 Ants Eskola (1908–1989), Soviet-Estonian actor and singer born Gerhardt Esperk
 Gerhardt Laves (1906–1993), American linguist
 Gerhardt Neef (1946–2010), German footballer

As a surname

Alban Gerhardt (born 1969), German cellist
Anna Gerhardt (born 1998), German association football player
Carl Jakob Adolf Christian Gerhardt (1833–1902), German internist
Charles Gerhardt (conductor) (1927–1999), American conductor
Charles Frédéric Gerhardt (1816–1856), French chemist
Charles H. Gerhardt (1895–1976), American general
Dieter Gerhardt (born 1935), commodore in the South African Navy and Soviet spy
Elena Gerhardt (1883–1961), German singer 
Hans-Jürgen Gerhardt (born 1954), East German bobsledder
Ida Gerhardt (1905–1997), Dutch poet 
Joe Gerhardt (1855–1922), Major League Baseball player 
Joseph Gerhardt (1817–1881), Union Army brigadier general during the American Civil War
Nyema Gerhardt (born 1985), Swiss footballer
Paul Gerhardt (1607–1676), German hymn writer
Bob Gerhardt (1903–1989), American rower 
Sue Gerhardt (born 1953), British psychoanalytic psychotherapist
Tom Gerhardt (born 1957), German actor and comedian
Yannick Gerhardt (born 1994), German association football player
Wolfgang Gerhardt (born 1943), German politician

Fictional characters
The title heroine of the 1911 novel Jennie Gerhardt by Theodore Dreiser
Mack Gerhardt and Tiffy Gerhardt, in the American TV series The Unit
The Gerhardt crime family, in the American TV series Fargo
The inventor of the magical economic system in Max Gladstone's Craft Sequence
Gerhardt Frankenstein, brother of Dr. Victor Frankenstein in the ABC fantasy series Once Upon A Time

See also
Gerhard
Gerhart (disambiguation)
Gérard

German-language surnames
German masculine given names
Surnames from given names